James Adams Ekin (August 31, 1819 – March 27, 1891) was an American officer who served in the Union Army in the American Civil War. He achieved fame as a member of the military commission trying the conspirators involved with the assassination of President Abraham Lincoln.

Early life
Ekin was born August 31, 1819, in Pittsburgh, Pennsylvania, to James and Susan Burling (Bayard) Ekin.  His mother was a daughter of Colonel Stephen A. Bayard of the Continental Army.  He served an apprenticeship as a steamboat builder, which eventually led to his first career as a steamboat builder in Pittsburgh.

Civil War
At the outbreak of the Civil War, Ekin enlisted April 25, 1861 in the 12th Pennsylvania Infantry (a 3-month regiment) as a lieutenant and was assigned regimental quartermaster.  Ekin mustered out with the regiment on August 5, 1861, at Harrisburg, Pennsylvania.  He was subsequently promoted captain and assistant quartermaster August 7, 1861 and served in the Quartermaster's Department.  Ekin and was promoted to lieutenant colonel February 15, 1864, then promoted again to colonel August 2, 1864.  He was brevetted in the regular army major, lieutenant colonel, colonel and brigadier general, all on March 13, 1865.  In addition to his volunteer ranks, Ekin was made a captain in the regular army March 13, 1863, lieutenant colonel and deputy quartermaster general July 29, 1865.

Lincoln assassination trial
Despite his excellent service in the Army quartermaster department, Ekin is remembered largely for his participation as a member of the military tribunal that heard the case against eight conspirators in the assassination of President Lincoln.

Post-war service
Ekin remained in the U.S. Army following the Civil War with the rank of lieutenant colonel and deputy quartermaster general until February 13, 1882, when he was promoted to colonel.  He retired from the Army on August 31, 1883.

Posts
Ekin served at Pittsburgh, as acting assistant commissary of subsistence in 1861; at Indianapolis, Indiana, as assistant quartermaster, 1861–1863; at Washington, D.C., as quartermaster of the cavalry bureau, 1863–1864; as chief quartermaster of the Cavalry Corps, Army of the Potomac, in 1864; as officer in charge of the 1st division, Quartermaster General's Office, Washington, D.C., 1864–1870; as chief quartermaster of the 5th District, Department of Texas, Department of the South, and Department of Louisville, Kentucky until his retirement.

Family
Ekin married Diana Craighead Walker and together they had five children:  James Adams (1844–1847), Nancy Walker (1845–1868), Mary Elizabeth (1847–1934), Susan Bayard (1849), and William Moody (1853–1907).  Mary Elizabeth Ekin married Augustus Everett Willson July 23, 1877, who served as the 36th Governor of Kentucky, 1907–1911.  William M. Ekin followed in his father's career and joined the U.S. Army, rising to the rank of captain in the Quartermaster's Department.

Ekin died March 27, 1891, in Louisville, Kentucky and was buried in Cave Hill National Cemetery.

In popular culture
Eakin is portrayed in the film The Conspirator (2010) by actor John Deifer.

See also

 List of American Civil War brevet generals (Union)

Notes

References
 Eicher, John H. & David J. Eicher. Civil War High Commands (Stanford, CA: Stanford University Press), 2001. 
 Johnson, Rossiter (ed.).  The Twentieth Century Biographical Dictionary of Notable Americans Vol. III (Boston, MA:  The Biographical Society), 1904. [See p. 409.]

External links

1819 births
1891 deaths
Union Army colonels
United States Army officers
People of Pennsylvania in the American Civil War
People associated with the assassination of Abraham Lincoln
Burials at Cave Hill Cemetery
Military personnel from Pittsburgh